The Miles M.30 X-Minor was an experimental aircraft, designed by Miles Aircraft to evaluate the characteristics of blended fuselage and wing intersections.

Design and development
Begun in 1938, the X series of designs was Miles designation M.26, covering a wide range of aircraft designs from small feeder-liners to very large 8-engined transatlantic transports.

To investigate the design philosophy of the blended wing/body Miles was given a contract to design and build a sub-scale flying model of the X.9 design, which emerged as the M.30 X-Minor. The small size of the X Minor made it impossible to follow the buried engine design exactly; the engines were too large and had to be mounted externally, resulting in an aircraft similar in layout but differing in aerodynamics. The X Minor first flew in February 1942, providing Miles with useful data for several years. A larger scale prototype of the X transport was planned but never built.

Specifications (M.30 X-Minor)

See also

References

Notes

Bibliography

 Amos, Peter. and Brown, Don Lambert. Miles Aircraft Since 1925, Volume 1. London: Putnam Aeronautical, 2000. .

External links

 Museum of Berkshire Aviation - Miles 30 page
 Eight-Engine, 55-Seat Plane to Have a 3,450-Mile Range Popular Mechanics August 1944

1940s British experimental aircraft
M.30
Aircraft first flown in 1942
Twin piston-engined tractor aircraft